Jason John Cowley (born 9 October 1995) is an English footballer who plays as a forward for Stourbridge.

Career
Cowley began his career with Redditch Borough. During his time at Redditch Borough, Cowley scored 26 goals in 25 games as the club won the 2015–16 Midland League Division Three, earning a move to Redditch United. After struggling for game time, Cowley signed for Bromsgrove Sporting, initially on a dual registration. In his first season with the club, Cowley scored 42 goals in 42 games in all competitions. During his time with Bromsgrove Sporting, Cowley helped the team to secure three promotions in three seasons, and scored 74 goals in two seasons. In March 2019, in a game against Corby Town, he scored a "spectacular" goal for the club, leading to calls for Cowley to be nominated for the FIFA Puskás Award. He signed for Stevenage in May 2019. He went on join Solihull Moors for a month long loan in January 2020.

He was released by Stevenage at the end of the 2019–20 season.

Following his release, Cowley played in a friendly with previous club Bromsgrove Sporting. He scored once in this match.  

On 14 September 2020, Cowley signed for National League club Macclesfield Town. However, on 16 September the club was wound up due to debts. Cowley later returned to Southern League Premier Division Central side Bromsgrove Sporting, signing for them on 2 October 2020. On 1 January 2021, Cowley joined National League North side Kidderminster Harriers on a one-month loan deal.

He signed for Stourbridge in June 2021.

Career statistics

Club

References

External links

1995 births
Living people
English footballers
Association football forwards
Redditch United F.C. players
Bromsgrove Sporting F.C. players
Stevenage F.C. players
English Football League players
Redditch Borough F.C. players
AFC Telford United players
Solihull Moors F.C. players
Macclesfield Town F.C. players
Kidderminster Harriers F.C. players
Stourbridge F.C. players